Steven "Steve" French is an American actor, television announcer and film and television voice-over actor. French is the recipient of a Drama Desk Award for the musical In Transit; and known for his voice-over work in such television shows as Unbreakable Kimmy Schmidt and announcer for Match Game with host Alec Baldwin, along with film The Guardian Brothers. He has appeared on- and off-Broadway. Since 2021, he hosts the weekly podcast version of the television series Unsolved Mysteries.

Career

French first appeared on stage in Barton Bishop’s “Still the River Runs,” at Center Stage Zootopia Theater Company, in New York City. He then went on to appear as a black jack dealer on the television soap opera All My Children.

In 2013, French appeared in an episode on The Michael J. Fox Show. He later went on to provide voice-over credits for such films as The Guardian Brothers, and two episodes on the television series Unbreakable Kimmy Schmidt with Ellie Kemper.

After winning a Drama Desk Award, French became the host for the ‘’Broadway Inspirational Voices’’ podcast; along with the television announcer for the new revived  "Match Game" starring Alec Baldwin He also voiced promos for Major League Baseball on ESPN.

Filmography

Television

Film

Video games

References

External links

Steve French Voice Over

21st-century American male actors
Living people
Place of birth missing (living people)
Year of birth missing (living people)